Bakhtawar is a Pakistani drama television series directed by Shahid Shafaat and first broadcast on Hum TV from 17 July 2022. It is produced by Momina Duraid under banner MD Productions. It features Yumna Zaidi in the titular role as a young headstrong girl who wants escape from her difficulties and create a better tomorrow for herself. It ended on 29 January 2023, after 25 episodes.

Plot 

Lives in a small village, Bakhtawar is an ambitious student living in a family having mother, a disabled brother, and a sister. Her gambler father forcefully sends her older sister in a forced marriage, and himself goes leaving the house. Due to poverty her brother dies on which her uncle tries to get her marry her with his mentally challenged son forcefully. She doesn't let her uncle to do so and flees to the Karachi with her mother.

There, they live in Sakina's house who is Shareefa's friend and lives with her husband. Bakhtawar tries to get job but gets rejected from everywhere until she gets a job of bus hostess. However, it becomes difficult for her to pursue the job due to the behaviour of male passengers and her friend's murder. Sakina tells her husband that she will sell out them to Hameed as now she is jobless, unable to pay them. Bakhtawar hears it, leaves her house and rents a room from Haji Nazar, a shady man who lives with his wife and is not in the favour of women's freedom. She eventually has to disguise herself as a man so she can try to get a job. Bakhtawar then works in a restaurant as a waiter and witnesses someone getting shot. She stays behind to help him and later, he hires her for his job.

Cast 
 Yumna Zaidi as Bakhtawar, The only daughter of a poor mother and a greedy fugitive father who runs away from the village to the city to avoid marrying her psycho cousin and works various jobs to make ends meet. 
 Ali Wasi Kazmi as Ahad, Son of a middle-class landlord and brother of Bakhtawar's friend who loved Bakhtawar and wanted to marry her and helped Bakhtawar leave the village and flee to the city.
 Zaviyar Nauman Ijaz as Malik Dilawar, son of famous politician Malik Sher Zaman, who studied abroad before returning to Pakistan.
 Adnan Shah Tipu as Amin, Shareefa's brother and Bakhtawar's uncle
 Huma Nawab as Shareefa, Bakhtawar's Mother
 Saqib Sumeer as Haji Nazar
 Mizna Waqas as Naveeda (Haji Nazar's wife)
 Salma Asim as Sakina, Shareefa's friend
 Aslam Sheikh as Ghaffar, Sakina's husband
 Qaiser Khan Nizamani as Malik Sher Zaman
 Fazila Qazi as Malik Sher Zaman's wife
 Sachal Afzal as Salar, Huriya's elder brother
 Ayesha Sohail as Nazneen, Huriya's friend
 Noreen Gulwani as Huriya, Malik Dilawar's fiancé
 Babar Ali as Malik Dastageer, Huriya's father
 Sunil Shankar as Sheeda
 Shamoon Abbasi as Mohsin, Malik Dilawar's friend

Guest 
 Noor ul Hassan as Bakhtawar's father (Episode 1)

Production 

The details about the project were first reported in May 2022, with Sajal Aly was first selected for the titular role but later she left the project after shooting some days and eventually replaced by Yumna Zaidi. It was also reported that Zaidi will pair opposite Arslan Nasser.

The first look of the series was unveiled on 4 July 2022.

Reception

Critical reception 
The drama received critical acclaim instantly right after its first episode. It was praised for its fast pace and close-to-reality plot. Yumna Zaidi is being continuously praised for her performance as Bakhtawar.

Television ratings
Bakhtawar was highest rated Hum TV program of 2022.

References 

2022 Pakistani television series debuts